Dorothy Dearing (April 17, 1913 – April 19, 1965) was an American actress. She is best known for appearing in Up the River (1938), Free, Blonde and 21 (1940) and The Great Profile (1940). She married actor Roland Drew in 1946, and they had one child.

She died in Beverly Hills, California. She is interred with her husband in Angeles Abbey Memorial Park, Compton, California.

Filmography

References

External links 

Rotten Tomatoes profile

1913 births
1965 deaths
People from Colorado
Actresses from Colorado
American film actresses
20th-century American actresses